Lee Rae-jun (born 19 March 1997) is a South Korean footballer who currently plays as a midfielder for Madura United.

Career statistics

Club
.

Notes

References

External links

1997 births
Living people
South Korean footballers
South Korean expatriate footballers
Association football forwards
K League 1 players
J3 League players
K League 2 players
Pohang Steelers players
Tochigi SC players
Ansan Greeners FC players
Busan IPark players
South Korean expatriate sportspeople in Japan
Expatriate footballers in Japan
Sportspeople from Busan